Dovhal, Dovgal, or Douhal is a surname. Notable people with the surname include:

 Anatoliy Dovhal (born 1976), Ukrainian sprinter
 Pavel Dovgal (born 1975), Belarusian modern pentathlete
 Yuliya Dovhal (born 1983), Ukrainian weightlifter

See also
 

Belarusian-language surnames
Ukrainian-language surnames